Amna Babar (born December 28, 1992) is Pakistani model. Winning the Best Emerging Talent - Fashion award at 13th Lux Style Awards in 2014, and received her first Lux Style Award nomination as Best Model Female at 14th Lux Style Awards and Best Model Female at 3rd Hum Awards and 4th Hum Awards respectively.

Khawar Riaz and has since then collaborated with many renowned names like Ammar Belal, Fahad Hussayn, Ali Zeeshan, Ather Shahzad, Guddu Shani, Maraam & Aabroo, Deeves, Nilofer Shahid, Saim Ali and Rana Noman Haq. She regularly appears on PFDC Sunsilk Fashion Week and Pakistan Fashion Week.

With the career-spanning of just half-decade she has established herself as one of the leading fashions models of the country, appearing at Pakistan Fashion Design Council fashions shows, seminars and fashion weeks. She is the brand ambassador of Sana Salinas's Lawn for three years, and stated, "It's my third year [being the lawn ambassador for Sana Safinaz]." After gaining wide spread acclaim she won the Best Emerging Talent - Fashion at 13th Lux Style Awards and received her first Model nomination for Best Model - Female at 14th Lux Style Awards, which she lost to supermodel and actress Amna Ilyas. Discussing Ilyas's win she said, "I didn't win it (the award). I barely have five years of experience in the field," she explained, "In my opinion, Amna Ilyas deserved to win [and if not her, then] Nooray Bhatti. Not only were they the right contenders, but they’ve also been in the industry for eight years. So, better luck next time to me,”. She subsequently received Hum Award for Best Model Female nominations at 3rd Hum Awards, 4th Hum Awards and recently took home the well deserved award of  Best Model - Female at the 17th Lux Style Awards, held at the Expo Center in Lahore, Pakistan.

Regarding her acting career she explained, "I am currently stressing on my modelling career and giving it my best shot," adding she has no plans of venturing into films for at least two years. "I am not planning to step into the world of films anytime soon. But if I get an extremely good offer, I might just take it." She further states about her scree debut, "I would certainly opt for a Pakistani film for my first project. Bollywood bohot door ki baat hai. Pehlay apni Pehchan Pakistan mein tou bana lein. [Bollywood is too far-fetched. I would like to be recognized in Pakistan first],".

Music videos

Awards and nominations

References

External links
 
 Amna Babat at Lux

Living people
Pakistani female models
People from Lahore
1992 births